Atoxon is a genus of gastropods belonging to the family Urocyclidae.

The species of this genus are found in Africa.

Species:

Atoxon cavallii 
Atoxon fuelleborni 
Atoxon hildebrandti 
Atoxon kiboense 
Atoxon martensi 
Atoxon pallens 
Atoxon schulzei

References

Urocyclidae